Janakavi Keshari Dharmaraj Thapa (जनकवि केशरी धर्मराज थापा) (1924 - 14 October 2014 ) was one of the most significant Nepali folk singers.  He is most famous for his songs "Hariyo Danda Maathi (हरियो डाँडा माथि हह माले हह )", "Nepali le Maya Maaryo Barilai (नेपालीले माया मार्यो वरिलै)". Dharmaraj Thapa started singing hyms, folk songs including dancing acts from his early childhood. He was married to 13yrs old Shavitri at the age of 15 on 28th Baisakh, 1996 B.S. He is also honoured as lifetime member at the Nepal Academy.

Songs
Some of the notable songs collected and sung by Dharmaraj Thapa are
 Hariyo Danda Maathi (हरियो डाँडा माथि)
 Nepali Le Maya Maaryo Barilai (नेपालीले माया मार्यो वरिलै)
 Suna Mero Nirmaya (सुन मेरो निरमाया)
 Saahili Rimai (साँहिली रिमै चौरी गाई, झर्यो रिमै मधु बनैमा)
 Aaja Malai Sancho Chaina (आज मलाई सञ्चो छैन)
 Aaipugyau Relaima (आईपुग्यौ रेलैमा, नौबजे बेलैमा .. देहरादुनैमा साथी देहरादुनैमा)

Books
Dharmaraj wrote the following books:
 Lamichane Thapa ko Vamshavali ("Genealogy of the Lamichhane Thapa")
 Nala Damayanti 
 Loka Sanskriti ko Ghera ma Kam jung 
 Mukti natha Darshana

Awards
Including the title "Janakabi Keshari", Dharmaraj Thapa has been awarded with several prestigious awards.

References

Nepalese folk singers
20th-century Nepalese male singers
1924 births
2014 deaths
People from Pokhara
Jagadamba Shree Puraskar winners